Luken is a male Basque name, as a form of Lucian or Lucius, and a Dutch surname. Notable people with the name include:

 Charlie Luken (born 1951), American politician 
 Jesse Luken (born 1983), American actor, producer, and writer
 Jim Luken (1921–1979), American politician 
 Luken Baker (born 1997),American baseball player
 Tom Luken (1925), American politician 
 Tom Luken (American football) (born 1950), American football player
 Virgil Luken (born 1942), American swimmer

See also
 Luken Communications, broadcasting company
 Lukens
 Lukin
 Murders of Neta Sorek and Kristine Luken

Dutch-language surnames